Langona is a genus of spiders in the family Salticidae (jumping
spiders).

Langona species are similar to those of the genus Aelurillus.

Species
 Langona alfensis Heciak & Prószynski, 1983 – Sudan
 Langona aperta (Denis, 1958) – Afghanistan
 Langona atrata Peng & Li, 2008 – China
 Langona avara Peckham & Peckham, 1903 – Southern Africa
 Langona bhutanica Prószynski, 1978 – Bhutan, China
 Langona biangula Peng, Li & Yang, 2004 – China
 Langona bisecta Lawrence, 1927 – Namibia
 Langona bitumorata Próchniewicz & Heciak, 1994 – Tanzania
 Langona bristowei Berland & Millot, 1941 – West, Central Africa
 Langona goaensis Prószynski, 1992 – India
 Langona hongkong Song et al., 1997 – Hong Kong
 Langona improcera Wesołowska & Russell-Smith, 2000 – Tanzania
 Langona kurracheensis Heciak & Prószynski, 1983 – India
 Langona maculata Peng, Li & Yang, 2004 – China
 Langona magna Caporiacco, 1947 – East Africa
 Langona maindroni (Simon, 1886) – Senegal
 Langona mallezi (Denis, 1947) – Egypt
 Langona manicata Simon, 1901 – South Africa
 Langona mediocris Wesołowska, 2000 – Zimbabwe
 Langona minima Caporiacco, 1949 – Kenya
 Langona oreni Prószynski, 2000 – Israel
 Langona pallida Prószynski, 1993 – Saudi Arabia, Afghanistan
 Langona pallidula Logunov & Rakov, 1998 – Turkmenistan
 Langona pecten Próchniewicz & Heciak, 1994 – Kenya, Tanzania
 Langona pilosa Wesołowska, 2006 – Namibia
 Langona redii (Audouin, 1826) – Egypt, Israel, Syria
 Langona rufa Lessert, 1925 – Ethiopia, East Africa
 Langona senegalensis Berland & Millot, 1941 – Senegal
 Langona simoni Heciak & Prószynski, 1983 – India
 Langona tartarica (Charitonov, 1946) – Central Asia, China
 Langona tigrina (Simon, 1885) – India
 Langona trifoveolata (Lessert, 1927) – Congo basin
 Langona ukualuthensis Lawrence, 1927 – Namibia
 Langona vitiosa Wesołowska, 2006 – Namibia
 Langona warchalowskii Wesołowska, 2007 – South Africa

Footnotes

References
  (2000): An Introduction to the Spiders of South East Asia. Malaysian Nature Society, Kuala Lumpur.
  (2009): The world spider catalog, version 9.5. American Museum of Natural History.

Salticidae
Spiders of Africa
Spiders of Asia
Salticidae genera